A congress is a formal meeting of the representatives of different countries, constituent states, organizations, trade unions, political parties, or other groups. The term originated in Late Middle English to denote an encounter (meeting of adversaries) during battle, from the Latin congressus.

Political congresses

International relations
The following congresses were formal meetings of representatives of different nations:
The Congress of Aix-la-Chapelle (1668), which ended the War of Devolution
The Congress of Aix-la-Chapelle (1748), which ended the War of the Austrian Succession
The Congress of Aix-la-Chapelle (1818)
The Congress of Berlin (1878), which settled the Eastern Question after the Russo-Turkish War (1877–1878)
The Congress of Gniezno (1000)
The Congress of Laibach (1821)
The Congress of Panama, an 1826 meeting organized by Simón Bolívar
The Congress of Paris (1856), which ended the Crimean War
The Congress of Troppau (1820)
The Congress of Tucumán (1816)
The Congress of Utrecht (1712–1713)
The Congress of Verona (1822)
The Congress of Vienna (1814–15), which settled the shape of Europe after the Napoleonic Wars
The Congress of the Council of Europe.

Legislatures

Presidential and semi-presidential systems
In the mid-1770s, to emphasize each one's status as a state in its own right, the term was chosen by the British colonies that became the United States of America. The term has since been adopted by many nations to refer to their legislatures.
The United States Congress is the bicameral legislative branch of the United States federal government.
The Continental Congress (1774–1781) was a convention of delegates from the Thirteen Colonies that became the Congress of the Confederation (1781–1789), legislature of the United States under the Articles of Confederation.
The Confederate States Congress of 1861–1865, during the American Civil War.
The Congress of Guatemala (Spanish: Congreso de la República) is the unicameral legislature of Guatemala.
The National Congress of Honduras (Spanish: Congreso nacional) is the legislative branch of the government of Honduras.
The Congress of Mexico is the legislative branch of Mexican government.
The Congress of Paraguay is the bicameral legislature of Paraguay.
The Congress of the Argentine Nation (Spanish: Congreso de la Nación Argentina) is the legislative branch of the government of Argentina.
The Congress of the Dominican Republic is the bicameral legislature of the Dominican Republic.
The Palau National Congress (Palauan: Olbiil era Kelulau) is the bicameral legislative branch of the Republic of Palau.
The Congress of the Federated States of Micronesia is the unicameral legislature of the Federated States of Micronesia.
The Congress of the Philippines (Filipino: Kongreso ng Pilipinas) is the legislative branch of the Philippine government.
The Congress of the Republic of Peru (Spanish: Congreso de la República) is the unicameral legislature of Peru.
The Congress of Colombia (Spanish: Congreso de la República) is the bicameral legislature of Colombia.
The National Congress of Bolivia was the national legislature of Bolivia before being replaced by the Plurinational Legislative Assembly.
The National Congress of Brazil is the bicameral legislature of Brazil.
The National Congress of Chile (Spanish: Congreso Nacional) is the legislative branch of the government of Chile.
The National Congress of Ecuador was the unicameral legislature of Ecuador before being replaced by the National Assembly.
France:
The Congress of the French Parliament refers specifically when both houses of France's legislature sit together as a single body, usually at the Palace of Versailles, to vote on revisions to the Constitution, to listen to an address by the President of the French Republic, and, in the past, to elect the President of the Republic
The Congress of New Caledonia is the national legislature under the semi-presidential system of the autonomous collectivity.

Non-presidential systems
Spanish Congress of Deputies (Spanish: Congreso de los Diputados) is the lower house of the Cortes Generales, Spain's legislative branch.
The National Congress of Belgium was a temporary legislative assembly in 1830, which created a constitution for the new state.
The legislature of the People's Republic of China is known in English as the National People's Congress.
The Congress of People's Deputies of the Soviet Union was the legislature and nominal supreme institution of state power in the Soviet Union. 
Congress of People's Deputies of Russia was modeled after the Soviet Union's and existed in 1990–1993.
The Congress of Cuba was the bicameral legislature of Cuba from 1902–1959.

Parties
Many political parties have a party congress every few years to make decisions for the party and elect governing bodies, while others call it a party convention. Congress is included in the name of several political parties, especially those in former British colonies:
Canary Islands
National Congress of the Canaries
Eswatini
Ngwane National Liberatory Congress
Fiji
National Congress of Fiji
Guyana
People's National Congress
India
Indian National Congress
All India Trinamool Congress
Kerala Congress
Nationalist Congress Party
Tamil Maanila Congress
YSR Congress
BSR Congress
All India N.R. Congress
Lesotho
Basotho Congress Party
Lesotho Congress for Democracy
Lesotho People's Congress
Malawi
Malawi Congress Party
Malaysia
Malaysian Indian Congress
Namibia
Congress of Democrats
Nepal
Nepali Congress
Pakistan
Peoples Revolutionary Congress Pakistan
Sierra Leone
All People's Congress
South Africa
African National Congress
Congress of the People
Pan-Africanist Congress
Sri Lanka
All Ceylon Tamil Congress
Sri Lanka Muslim Congress
Sudan
National Congress (Sudan)
Trinidad and Tobago
United National Congress
Uganda
Ugandan People's Congress
Iraqi National Congress

Political organizations
National Congress of American Indians
Congress of Racial Equality
Continental Congress 2.0

Labour congresses
Congress of Industrial Organizations
Trade Union Congress of the Philippines
Trades Union Congress
Canadian Labour Congress

Religious Congresses 
Catholic Congresses
Eucharistic Congresses
1947 Marian Congress

Non-political congresses
Congress is an alternative name for a large national or international academic conference. For instance, the World Congress on Men's Health is an annual meeting on men's medical issues.

Organizations in some athletic sports, such as bowling, have historically been named "congresses". The predecessors to the United States Bowling Congress (formed in 1995) were the American Bowling Congress (founded in 1895) and the Women's International Bowling Congress (founded in 1927).
A chess congress is a chess tournament, in one city, where a large number of contestants gather to play competitive chess over a limited period of time; typically one day to one week.

ICCA Congress & Exhibition

References

External links

European affairs events
International congress calendar
Medical Congresses Around the World
Congress Youth Leader
 

Legislatures
Elections
Meetings